State Route 723 (SR 723) is a very short state highway located in east-central Ohio.  Having a length of just  and located just southwest of Cambridge, the route serves as a connector between Interstate 70 (I-70) at its exit 176 and the concurrency of U.S. Route 22 (US 22) and US 40.

Route description
The short SR 723 commences at I-70's exit 176, a trumpet interchange in Guernsey County's Cambridge Township.  Heading north from I-70 as a four-lane highway, SR 723 passes over the CSX railway and crosses the city limits of Cambridge.  A short distance later, SR 723 comes to an end as it meets US 22 and US 40 at a signalized T-intersection.

SR 723 is not considered a part of the National Highway System.

History
The roadway that carries SR 723 was constructed by 1961. For the first few years of its existence, SR 723 served as the western end of a section of I-70 that was complete. By 1967, I-70 was navigable in both directions from SR 723. Since then, no major changes have occurred to the route.

Major intersections

References

See also

723
Transportation in Guernsey County, Ohio
State highways in the United States shorter than one mile
Interstate 70